Bangabandhu National Stadium (romanised: Bongobondhu jateeyo stediyaam), also known as Dhaka Stadium, and formerly known as Dacca Stadium, is the national stadium and a multipurpose sports arena in Dhaka, Bangladesh. It is located in the Motijheel area in the heart of the city. It is the home venue for both the men's and women's national football teams.

The Bangabandhu National Stadium is one of the main football venues in Dhaka, together with the 25,000 capacity Bir Shreshtha Mustafa Kamal Stadium. The Bangabandhu Stadium, is well known for hosting an international friendly between Argentina and Nigeria in 2011.

The stadium has been renovated several times, most recently for the opening ceremony of the 2011 Cricket World Cup. It had a capacity close to 55,000 before the most recent renovation, but with a new capacity of 36,000 it is still the largest stadium in Bangladesh. Its current name was given to honour Sheikh Mujibur Rahman, the father of the nation, also known as "Bangabandhu" or "Friend of Bengal".

History

Early history 

The Bangabandhu National Stadium in Dhaka is the only venue in the world to have hosted an inaugural home fixture for two Test nations: Pakistan and Bangladesh.[5] India were the visitors on both occasions: in 1954–55, when Dacca was the capital of East Pakistan, and in 1976–77, when the first unofficial Test match was held between Bangladesh against the touring MCC from England. And the following year the Sri Lankan national team visited Bangladesh to play a few one-day, two-day and three-day unofficial matches against BCCB XI and Bangladesh National team. After that teams like Deccan Blues from India and MCC toured Bangladesh several times to play against BCCB XI and Bangladesh national team respectively.

Alongside cricket, the stadium was also known to host the historic Dhaka League, which was the country's premier football league even before independence of Bangladesh. In the 80s when football's popularity was skyrocketing, the Dhaka Derby attracted thousands of fans into the stadium from all over the country. The stadium regularly hosted the now defunct Aga Khan Gold Cup, which by many is considered to be first organized international competition that involved club teams around Asia.

The 1978 AFC Youth Championship was the first major international tournament the stadium hosted. The stadium was also renovated for the occasion, the East Gallery was constructed and a women's gallery was arranged for the first time. The VIP gallery was also redecorated, as this was the first international football related tournament being held in Bangladesh. A total of forty games were played in the newly renovated stadium during the tournament held in October.

The stadium has a history of hosting number of historic sports event starting from cricket, football, hockey to boxing. In February 1978, boxer Muhammad Ali fought an exhibition boxing match at the stadium, the then Dacca Stadium, with a 12-year-old Bengali boy.

Home of Bangladesh football
With a purpose-built cricket stadium being constructed on the outskirts of the city, the ground was taken out of commission at the end of the 2004–05 season, and handed over for the sole use of the Bangladesh national football team. Other than being used for the 2011 Cricket World Cup opening ceremony, the stadium has been mainly used for football purposes since the turn of the decade.

The stadium has hosted the SAFF Championship three times to date. First during the 2003 edition when Bangladesh lifted the trophy for the first time in history, in front of  46,000 local supporters. Since then the 2009 and most recently the 2018 editions of the tournament have all taken place at the stadium. Ever since the inception of the Bangladesh Premier League, in 2007, the stadium has been used has been used to host majority of the league seasons.

On 6 September 2011, Bangabandhu National Stadium hosted an international friendly football match between the full-strength Argentina and Nigeria teams, featuring Lionel Messi, Sergio Agüero, Javier Mascherano and Mikel John Obi among the other star players of both nations. Argentina won 3–1 with goals from then-Real Madrid teammates Gonzalo Higuaín and Ángel Di María, and an own goal from Nigeria's Elderson Echiéjilé with Chinedu Obasi scoring Nigeria's lone goal. Bangladeshi referee Tayeb Shamsuzzaman officiated the game, which drew 25,000 spectators despite ticket prices starting at US$100.

On 13 November 2020, the stadium hosted the first of two matches between Bangladesh and Nepal during the Mujib Borsho Fifa International Football Series, arranged by the Bangladesh Football Federation. Bangladesh won the first game of the series 2–0, while the second game which was held four days later, finished goalless which lead the hosts to clinch the series on aggregate. The friendlies helped football return to Bangabandhu National Stadium and the country after a long absence due to the rise of COVID-19 cases worldwide.

Modern use

Currently, the stadium is used by the Bangladesh national football team and Bangladesh women's national football team and also for athletics. The stadium is also used to host the Bangladesh Football Premier League and Bangladesh Championship League games.  The total seating capacity is about 36,000.

The stadium is located next to National Hockey Stadium. The stadium was used for competitions of the 2010 South Asian Games, including football and athletics.

Tournament results

2018 SAFF Championship

2009 SAFF Championship

2003 SAFF Gold Cup

Cricket stats and records
The venue hosted its last international cricket match on 1 March 2005. After 2005, hosting of International Cricket status was shifted to Sher-e-Bangla National Stadium, which was situated in Mirpur, Dhaka.

Till 2005 the venue has hosted
 Test matches – 17
 One Day International – 58
 T20I – 0

Renovation: 2021 Restructuring into a modern football stadium
From September 2021, the stadium went under a year-long renovation process, which has been scheduled to end in early 2023, as the Bangladesh Football Federation have planned to organize future football related events on the ground, and transform it into a modernized football venue. Field development, construction of sheds in galleries, installation of chairs in galleries, modernization of toilets for international and local players, installation of floodlights, installation of CCTV cameras, installation of generators, installation of LED giant screens, installation of new athletic tracks, installation of digital advertising boards, creation of media centers, ticket counters, Dope Test Room Building, Medical Room, VIP Box Construction, President Box, Toilet development, medical equipment, sub-station equipment, AC and solar panel supply will be the works involved in the renovation of the stadium.

Renovation : 2011 ICC Cricket World Cup, Opening Ceremony

Bangabandhu National Stadium hosted the opening ceremony of the 2011 Cricket World Cup co-hosted by Bangladesh, Sri Lanka and India on 17 February 2011. The stadium was exclusively modernised and renovated into a world class stadium to host the opening ceremony. The capacity of the stadium had been decreased to 36,000, a large LED screen had been installed, a modern roof had also been attached over the press box. The entrances and VIP box have also been upgraded to host the grand gala inaugural ceremony. The press box, along with a refreshment stand and the VIP box have been revamped. The stadium now has state of the art facilities suitable for international sporting events.

See also
 Bangladesh Football Federation
 Bangladesh national football team
 Bangladesh women's national football team
 Bangladesh national under-23 football team
 Bangladesh national under-20 football team
 Bangladesh national under-17 football team
 Bangladesh Premier League
 List of football stadiums in Bangladesh
 Stadiums in Bangladesh
 List of Asian stadiums by capacity

References

External links
 BNS at BanglaFootball.net

Bangladesh national football team
Football venues in Bangladesh
National stadiums
Sports venues in Dhaka
Sport in Dhaka
Memorials to Sheikh Mujibur Rahman